Pearl Island is one of the San Juan Islands of San Juan County, Washington, United States. Named during the 1841 Wilkes Expedition, it lies off the western shore of San Juan Island, between it and Henry Island. Pearl Island has a land area of 0.151 km² (37.3 acres), only one family lives on this island full time.

References

Pearl Island: Blocks 4018 and 4019, Census Tract 9603, San Juan County, Washington United States Census Bureau

San Juan Islands